A flash mob is where a group of people rapidly gather and perform an unusual and pointless act and then quickly disperse.

Flash mob may also refer to:

Social activity 
 Pillow fight flash mob, a flash mob based upon a pillow fight
 Flash rob, a crime that shares similarities to a flash mob

Music
 Flash Mob (album), a 2014 album by Anton Schwartz
 Flashmob (album), a 2009 album by Vitalic
 Flashmob (musicians), Italian DJ/Producer

Technology
 Flash mob computing, ad hoc cluster computing

See also